Rakatāura, also known as Hape, is a legendary Polynesian navigator and a progenitor of many Māori iwi. Born in Hawaiki, Rakatāura was the senior tohunga (priest/navigator) who led the Tainui migratory canoe to New Zealand. Rakatāura is associated with stories involving the Manukau Harbour, the Te Tō Waka (the Ōtāhuhu Portage) and the Waikato. Many place names in Tāmaki Makaurau (modern-day Auckland) and the Waikato region reference Rakatāura, or are described in oral traditions as being named by Rakatāura.

Oral history

Rakatāura was born in Hawaiki, and was the eldest member of the senior line of his hapū. He received the name Hape, due to his inward-turning feet. Rakatāura was the senior tohunga (priest/navigator) of the Tainui migratory waka, and in some traditions, is identified as the shipbuilder of the vessel.

In Waiohua oral tradition, Rakatāura / Hape travels supernaturally to New Zealand, ahead of the Tainui crew. In this version, Rakatāura was chosen to represent his hapū on the Tainui canoe, however this was not popular due to his disability, and only the young and those with sound bodies and minds could travel. Rakatāura prayed to Tangaroa for his feet to be restored, however instead of healing his body, Tangaroa sent Kawea Kawea Ki te Whenua a Kupe, a taniwha (supernatural being) in the shape of a stingray to transport him. Rakatāura arrived at the Manukau Harbour, waiting at Ihumātao for the Tainui crew to arrive. Days later, the crew arrived, not from the mouth of the harbour, instead from the east (having crossed the Te Tō Waka at Ōtāhuhu over the Auckland isthmus). Rakatāura called out from the hill, hence the name Karangahape ("The Call of Hape"). Another supernatural tradition involves Rakatāura beating the Tainui crew to reach the Kawhia Harbour by leaping underground between the Māhia Peninsula and Kawhia.

In Te Kawerau ā Maki oral tradition, Rakatāura travelled to the Waitākere Ranges, bestowing names to the locations he visited. Some of these names include Hikurangi, the name he gave to a location near Piha which referenced a location in his homeland and became one of the traditional names for West Auckland and the Waitākere Ranges, and One Rangatira, the traditional name for Muriwai Beach, a name which commemorated his visit.

Other traditions link Rakatāura to the Ōtāhuhu Portage between the Tāmaki River and the Manukau Harbour. In some traditions, he is the tohunga who creates the portage, while in others he attempts to block the Tainui crew from using it and settling to the west. In these traditions, Rakatāura quarrels with Hoturoa, captain of the Tainui, because he refused to let Rakatāura marry his daughter Kahukeke. Instead of crossing the portage, Hoturoa and the crew of the Tainui sail around the entire Northland Peninsula to the Manukau Harbour. Rakatāura and his sister Hiaroa lit fires and sung incantations to prevent the main Tainui crew from settling around the harbour or the Waikato area. Rakatāura travelled south to the Whāingaroa Harbour (Raglan Harbour), establishing a tūāhupapa (sacred altar) on the mountain Karioi, and continued to sing incantations to dissuade the Tainui crew from discovering the areas he found. Rakatāura travelled further south to the Kawhia Harbour, where he met the Tainui crew, reconciled (either here or further south at Whareorino), and married Kahukeke (the daughter of Hoturoa), later returning to settle at Karioi.

Rakatāura is credited with exploring the forested interior of the Waikato region with his wife, naming places after the members of the Tainui crew, in order to establish land rights. He placed mauri stones from Hawaiki along the journey, as a way to entice birds to the areas he visited. During their travels, Kahukeke fell ill at Wharepūhunga, where Rakatāura built a house for her to rest in and recover. Kahukeke fell ill a second time at Pureora, however did not survive. After she dies, Rakatāura names Kakepuku after the shape of his wife when she was pregnant, and the area where he eventually settled, Te Aroha, after the love he felt for his wife. There, he married again, to a woman named Hinemarino.

Some traditions describe Rakatāura as settling at Rarotonga / Mount Smart in Tāmaki Makaurau with his wife, before travelling to the Waikato later in life.

Legacy 

Rakatāura / Hape is the namesake of Karangahape Peninsula and Karangahape Road in Auckland, and some of the Māori language names for Ōwairaka / Mount Albert, Te Ahi-kā-a-Rakataura ("The Continuous Fires of Rakataura") and Te Wai o Raka ("The Waters of Raka").  Te Motu a Hiaroa (Puketutu Island), one of the first permanent settlements of the Tainui people, is named after Rakatāura's sister Hiaroa. Rakatāura is cited in oral traditions as the figure who named many areas of the Waikato, including the Whāingaroa Harbour), Karioi, Maungatautari, Whakamaru, Pureora and Te Aroha.

The officially designated name for Mount Maunganui in the early 20th century was Rakataura, named after the tohunga by Bay of Plenty settler J. C. Adams, however this name never came into popular use.

Rakatāura is considered one of the ancestors of Tainui (including Ngāti Maniapoto and Ngāti Raukawa), historical Auckland iwi Ngā Oho, Te Kawerau ā Maki, and Waiohua tribes.

See also
 Tainui (canoe)

References

Legendary Polynesian people
Legendary progenitors
New Zealand people with disabilities
Tohunga
Tainui people
Te Kawerau ā Maki people
Te Waiohua people
Year of birth uncertain
Year of death uncertain